Nesolinoceras laluzbrillante is a species of ichneumon wasps. It is known from the Caribbean island of Hispaniola.

The larvae are parasitoids and the host species is unknown.

References

 Santos, Bernardo F. (2016) Generic redefinition and a new species of Nesolinoceras Ashmead (Hymenoptera, Ichneumonidae, Cryptinae). (American Museum Novitates, no. 3858)

Ichneumonidae
Insects described in 2016